Krš may refer to:

 Karst, a landscape formed from the dissolution of soluble rocks
 Krš, Croatia, a village near Perušić
 Krš, Žabljak a village in Žabljak Municipality, Montenegro

See also
 Femića Krš, a village in Bijelo Polje Municipality, Montenegro